The United States Senate Select Committee on the Tenth Census was created in 1878.  It continued to operate until 1887, when it became the United States Senate Committee on the Census.  The Committee was abolished in 1921.  Issues related to the U.S. Census and the U.S. Census Bureau are now under the jurisdiction of the United States Senate Committee on Homeland Security and Governmental Affairs.

Chairmen of the Select Committee on the Tenth Census, 1878–1887
Justin S. Morrill (R-VT) 1878–1879
George H. Pendleton (D-OH) 1879–1881
Eugene Hale (R-ME) 1881–1887

Chairmen of the Committee on the Census, 1887–1921
Eugene Hale (R-ME) 1887–1893
David Turpie (D-IN) 1893–1895
William Chandler (R-NH) 1895–1897
Thomas H. Carter (R-MT) 1897–1901
Joseph V. Quarles (R-WI) 1901–1905
Chester Long (R-KS) 1905–1909
Robert M. La Follette (R-WI) 1909–1913
William E. Chilton (D-WV) 1913–1916
Morris Sheppard (D-TX) 1916–1919
Howard Sutherland (R-WV) 1919–1921

Senate Committee on the Census
Census
1878 establishments in the United States
1921 disestablishments